Soul is the sixth studio album released by American country rock & southern rock band The Kentucky Headhunters. It was released in 2003 on Audium Entertainment. No singles were released from the album, although one of the tracks, "Have You Ever Loved a Woman?", was first a single for Freddie King in 1960.

Track listing

Personnel
The Kentucky Headhunters
Anthony Kenney – bass guitar, tambourine, harmonica, background vocals
Greg Martin – lead guitar, acoustic guitar, rhythm guitar
Doug Phelps – lead vocals on all tracks except "I Still Wanna Be Your Man" and "Have You Ever Loved a Woman", background vocals, rhythm guitar, cabasa, güiro
Fred Young – drums, congas, tambourine
Richard Young – acoustic guitar, rhythm guitar, background vocals, lead vocals on "I Still Wanna Be Your Man" and "Have You Ever Loved a Woman"
Guest musicians
Robbie Bartlett – second lead vocals on "Everyday People"
Chris Dunn – trombone
Jim Horn – alto saxophone, tenor saxophone, baritone saxophone, horn arrangements
Steve Patrick – trumpet
Reese Wynans — Hammond organ
Technical
David Barrick – engineer, mastering, mixing
Mark Capps – engineer
Mitchell Fox – executive producer
Emmylou Harris – stylist, grooming
Paul McGarry – guitar technician
Steve Wilson – engineer

References

The Kentucky Headhunters albums
E1 Music albums
2003 albums